Santa Rosa Creek Reservoir is a reservoir in Spring Lake Regional Park in the city of Santa Rosa, California, USA. It is impounded by an earthen dam built in 1963 and owned by the Sonoma County Water Agency.

See also
Lake Ralphine
List of lakes in California
List of lakes in the San Francisco Bay Area
List of reservoirs and dams in California
List of Sonoma County Regional Parks facilities

References

Infrastructure completed in 1963
Reservoirs in Sonoma County, California
Santa Rosa, California
Reservoirs in California
Reservoirs in Northern California